Rothschildia forbesi, the Forbes' silkmoth, is a species of silkmoth in the family Saturniidae.

The MONA or Hodges number for Rothschildia forbesi is 7761.

References

Further reading

 

forbesi
Moths described in 1934